The 1946 West Virginia Mountaineers football team was an American football team that represented West Virginia University as an independent during the 1946 college football season. In its fourth non-consecutive season under head coach Bill Kern, the team compiled a 5–5 record and was outscored by a total of 120 to 99. The team played its home games at Mountaineer Field in Morgantown, West Virginia. Victor Peelish was the team captain.

Schedule

References

West Virginia
West Virginia Mountaineers football seasons
West Virginia Mountaineers football